Genre is the term for any category of literature or other forms of art or culture.

Genre may also refer to:
Music genre, category of musical works with shared characteristics
Genre (magazine), an American gay men monthly
[[Genre (animated film)|Genre (animated film)]], a short film by animator Don HertzfeldtGenre (Westworld)'', season 3 episode 5 of American TV Sci-Fi series Westworld in 2020
Genre art, pictorial representations in any of various media that represent scenes or events from everyday life

People
Julien Genre (Julien Michelle Genre) (born 1989), Italian curler